Philipp Petzschner and Tim Pütz were the defending champions but only Pütz chose to defend his title, partnering Frederik Nielsen. Pütz lost in the final to Kevin Krawietz and Jürgen Melzer.

Krawietz and Melzer won the title after defeating Nielsen and Pütz 7–6(7–5), 6–2 in the final.

Seeds

Draw

References

External links
 Main draw

Open du Pays d'Aix - Doubles
2019 Doubles